The Bahia Group, also known as Bahia Series, is an Aptian geologic group of the Recôncavo Basin in Bahia, Brazil. Dinosaur remains are among the fossils that have been recovered from the formation, although none have yet been referred to a specific genus. The conglomerates were deposited in an estuarine environment.

See also 
 List of dinosaur-bearing rock formations
 List of stratigraphic units with indeterminate dinosaur fossils

References

Bibliography

Further reading 
 J. Mawson and A. S. Woodward. 1907. On the Cretaceous formation of Bahia (Brazil), and on vertebrate fossils collected therein. Quarterly Journal of the Geological Society of London 63:128-139

Geologic groups of South America
Geologic formations of Brazil
Cretaceous Brazil
Aptian Stage
Conglomerate formations
Tidal deposits
Formations